Shekar Baghan (also Romanized as Shekar Bāghān; also known as Shafar-Baga) is a village in Taher Gurab Rural District, in the Central District of Sowme'eh Sara County, Gilan Province, Iran. At the 2006 census, its population was 107, in 38 families.

References 

Populated places in Sowme'eh Sara County